CP-226,269 is a drug which acts as a dopamine agonist selective for the D4 subtype, which is used for researching the role of D4 receptors in the brain.

Synthesis

The piperazine used has dual use in the synthesis of ABT-724, ABT-670, Azaperone, MLS 1547 [315698-36-3], Revenast [85673-87-6], UMB38 & XH-148.

Weinreb ketone synthesis between 5-Fluoroindole-2-Carboxylic acid [399-76-8] (1) and N,O-Dimethylhydroxylamine Fb: [1117-97-1] Hcl: [6638-79-5] (2) gives the Weinreb–Nahm amide, 5-Fluoro-N-Methoxy-N-Methyl-Indole-2-Carboxamide, CID:23003585 (3). This intermediate is further reduced giving 5-Fluoro-Indole-2-Carbaldehyde [220943-23-7] (4). Reductive amination with 1-(2-Pyridyl)Piperazine [34803-66-2] (5) completed the synthesis CP-226,269 (6).

References

Dopamine agonists
Fluoroarenes
Indoles
Piperazines
2-Pyridyl compounds
Pfizer brands